Olivenza Fútbol Club is a Spanish football team located in the town of Olivenza in the province of Badajoz, autonomous community of Extremadura. It currently plays in Tercera División – Group 14, holding home matches at Ciudad Deportiva Ramón Rocha Maqueda, with a capacity of 5,000 spectators.

History 
The club was founded in 2011.

Season to season

8 seasons in Tercera División

References

Association football clubs established in 2011
2011 establishments in Spain
Football clubs in Extremadura
Province of Badajoz